The Lord of Alamut Hassan-i Sabbah is a Persian-language historical biography fiction story book by Zabihullah Mansouri under the name of Paul Amir, about the order of Hassan-i Sabbah set in Alamut, and Iran. The book covers the assassination of Nizam al-Mulk.

Film adaptation 
Iranian TV series

Reception 
The French book's writer's actual existence as well as the book's original history has been questioned.

See also 

 Nizari Ismaili state
 Nizari–Seljuk conflicts

References 

Historical novels
Ismailism